Marek Małecki (born 6 February 1938) is a Polish equestrian. He competed in two events at the 1972 Summer Olympics.

References

1938 births
Living people
Polish male equestrians
Olympic equestrians of Poland
Equestrians at the 1972 Summer Olympics
Sportspeople from Lviv
People from Lwów Voivodeship
20th-century Polish people